Enrico Pieranunzi (born 5 December 1949) is an Italian jazz pianist. He combines classical technique with jazz.

Biography
The son of Renata Brillantini and Alvaro Pieranunzi, Enrico Pieranunzi was encouraged to study music at a young age. His father was a jazz guitarist. He studied classical music until 1973 when he became a Professor of Music, and remained in the post for two years. In 1975 he left his teaching practice and played in trios and small ensembles. He has recorded over 60 albums and has also been active as a session musician.

Pieranunzi has performed with Frank Rosolino, Sal Nistico, Kenny Clarke, Johnny Griffin, Chet Baker, Joey Baron, Art Farmer, Jim Hall, Marc Johnson, Lee Konitz, Phil Woods, Bill Smith, Charlie Haden, Mads Vinding, Thomas Fonnesbæk, and Billy Higgins. He recorded the first album under his own name in 1975 and has performed with his own group at European and American jazz festivals. He has also composed several film scores.

Awards and honors
 1982 - Critics award for the Isis album - Soul Note (Enrico Pieranunzi Quartet & Quintet featuring Art Farmer)
 1983 - Musician of the year Musica Jazz Annual Poll (along with D'Andrea, Rava, Urbani, Trovesi, Gaslini, Bagnoli)
 1988 - Best Italian Group Musica Jazz Annual Poll (Space Jazz trio)
 1989 - Musician of the year Musica Jazz Annual Poll, Best Italian Group Musica Jazz Poll (Space Jazz Trio)
 1995 - Best CD of the Year Music & Discs "Flux & Change - Duo with Paul Motian (Soul Note)
 1996 - Choc de l'annee of Jazzman for the CD "The Night Gone By"
 1997 - Django d'Or Best European Musician
 2002 - Jazz Award "Palazzo Valentini" Province of Rome
 2003 - Musician of the Year Musica Jazz Annual Poll
 2005 - Jazz in Europe Award Guinness Jazz Festival (Cork)
 2008 - Musician of the Year. Musica jazz Annual Poll (along with Franco D'Andrea)
 2009 - Award of the French Académie du Jazz Francese for the best unpublished (Yellow and Blue Suites, duo with Marc Johnson - Challenge Records)
 2015 - Top Jazz 2014. A Life for Jazz

Discography

As leader
 Jazz a Confronto 24 (Horo, 1975)
 The Day After the Silence (Edipan, 1976)
 A Long Way (Carosello, 1978)
 From Always...to Now! (Edipan, 1978)
 Soft Journey with Chet Baker (Edipan, 1980)
 Isis (Soul Note, 1981)
 Inconsequence with Ronnie Cuber (Dire, 1983)
 Jazz Roads (CAM Jazz, 1983)
 Autumn Song (Enja, 1985)
 What's What (Demon, 1985)
 Moon Pie with Enzo Pietropaoli & Roberto Gatto (YVP Music, 1987)
 The Heart of the Ballad with Chet Baker (Philology, 1988)
 Solitudes with Lee Konitz (Philology, 1988)
 Parisian Portraits (IDA, 1991)
 In That Dawn of Music (Soul Note, 1993)
 Flux and Change with Paul Motian (Soul Note, 1995)
 The Night Gone By (Alfa, 1996)
 Seaward (Soul Note, 1996)
 Daedalus Wings (Challenge, 1999)
 Don't Forget the Poet (Challenge, 1999)
 Infant Eyes (Challenge, 2000)
 Improvised Forms for Trio (Challenge, 2000)
 Live in Switzerland (YVP Music, 2000)
 Evans Remembered (Via Veneto, 2001)
 Alone Together (Challenge, 2001)
 One Lone Star (YVP Music, 2002)
 Perugia Suite (Egea, 2002)
 Les Amants (Egea, 2004)
 Doorways  with Paul Motian (CAM Jazz, 2004)
 Duologues with Jim Hall (CAM Jazz, 2005)
 Special Encounter with Charlie Haden, Paul Motian (CAM Jazz, 2005)
 Live in Paris (Challenge, 2005)
 Live Conversations with Dado Moroni (Abeat, 2006)
 Jazzitaliano Live 2006 (Casa del Jazz, 2006)
 Sonatas and Improvisations (CAM Jazz, 2008)
 Wandering (CAM Jazz, 2009)
 Live at Birdland (CAM Jazz, 2010)
 Works and Improvisations (CAM Jazz, 2011)
 New York Reflections (CAM Jazz, 2012)
 Permutation (CAM Jazz, 2012)
 Deep Down (Soul Note, 2012)
 Originals (Jazzit, 2012)
 Stories (CAM Jazz, 2014)
 Autour De Martino (TCB, 2014)
 Proximity (CAM Jazz, 2015)
 Tales from the Unexpected (Intuition, 2015)
 Double Circle with Federico Casagrande (CAM Jazz, 2015)
 My Songbook (Via Veneto, 2016)
 Menage a Trois with Andre Ceccarelli (Bonsai Music, 2016)
 European Trio (Casa del Jazz, 2016)
 New Spring (CAM Jazz, 2016)
 Duke's Dream with Rosario Giuliani (Intuition, 2017)
 Play Gershwin with Gabriele Mirabassi, Gabriele Pieranunzi (CAM Jazz, 2018)
 Blue Waltz (Stunt, 2018)
 Monsieur Claude (Bonsai Music, 2018)
 Wine & Waltzes (CAM Jazz, 2018)
 New Visions (Storyville, 2019)
 Frame (CAM Jazz, 2020)
Common View (Challenge, 2020)

With Marc Johnson
 Deep Down (Soul Note, 1987)
 The Dream Before Us (IDA, 1992)
 Untold Story (IDA, 1994)
 Play Morricone (CAM Jazz, 2002)
 Trasnoche (Egea, 2003)
 Current Conditions (CAM Jazz, 2003)
 Play Morricone 2 (CAM Jazz, 2004)
 Ballads (CAM Jazz, 2006)
 Live in Japan (CAM Jazz, 2007)
 As Never Before (CAM Jazz, 2008)
 Yellow & Blue Suites (Challenge, 2008)
 Dream Dance (CAM Jazz, 2009)
 Live at the Village Vanguard (CAM Jazz, 2013)

As sideman
With Ennio Morricone
 Cinema Paradiso (DRG, 1988)
 Gli Occhiali D'Oro (Screen Trax, 1996)
 La Gabbia (GDM, 1996)
 Il Bandito Dagli Occhi (Azzurri Beat, 2013)

With Phil Woods
 Phil's Mood (Philology, 1990)
 Elsa (Philology, 1992)
 Live at the Corridoia Jazz Festival (Philology, 1992)

With others
 Alessandro Alessandroni, Sangue Di Sbirro (Four Flies, 2016)
 Chet Baker, Little Girl Blue (Philology, 1988)
 Brussels Jazz Orchestra & Bert Joris, The Music of Enrico Pieranunzi (W.E.R.F., 2015)
 Bruno Canino, Americas (CAM Jazz, 2016)
 Philip Catherine, Joe Labarbera, Hein Van De Geyn, Concert in Capbreton (Dreyfus, 2010)
 Andre Ceccarelli, Carte Blanche (Dreyfus, 2004)
 Kenny Clarke, Jazz a Confronto 20 (Horo, 1975)
 Riccardo Del Fra, A Sip of Your Touch (IDA, 1989)
 Riccardo Del Fra, Chet Visions (Cristal, 2019)
 Anne Ducros, Piano, Piano (Dreyfus, 2005)
 Claudio Fasoli, Hinterland (Edipan, 1979)
 Roberto Gatto, Roberto Gatto Plays Rugantino (CAM Jazz, 2000)
 Terje Gewelt, Oslo (Resonant Music, 2009)
 Charlie Haden, Silence (Soul Note, 1989)
 Charlie Haden, First Song (Soul Note, 1992)
 Lee Konitz, Blew (Philology, 1989)
 Mimmo Locasciulli, Quello Che Ci Resta (RCA, 1977)
 Jesper Lundgaard, 60 Out of Shape (Storyville, 2015)
 Tina May, Home Is Where the Heart Is (33 Jazz, 2015)
 Franco Micalizzi, Laure (Four Flies, 2015)
 Sal Nistico, Jazz a Confronto 16 (Horo, 1975)
 Enzo Pietropaoli, Orange Park (Gala, 1990)
 Gianfranco Plenizio, Liberi Armati (Pericolosi Beat, 2008)
 Enrico Rava, Nausicaa (Egea, 1994)
 Enrico Rava, Bella (Philology, 1994)
 Frank Rosolino, Jazz a Confronto 4 (Horo, 1973)
 Kenny Wheeler, Charlie Haden, Paul Motian, Fellini Jazz (CAM Jazz, 2003)
 Kai Winding, Duo Bones (Red, 1979)
 Mads Vinding, The Kingdom (Stunt, 1997)
 Mads Vinding, Yesterdays (Stunt, 2017)
 Renato Zero, Artide Antartide (Zerolandia, 1981)

References

Ertaskan, Feridun. "Enrico Pieranunzi: Blues & Bach - The Music of John Lewis". Cazkolik.com Album Review. Retrieved 2023-03-01.

External links
 Official Site

Italian jazz pianists
Italian male pianists
1949 births
Living people
Musicians from Rome
Italian session musicians
20th-century Italian musicians
21st-century Italian musicians
21st-century pianists
20th-century Italian male musicians
21st-century Italian male musicians
Male jazz musicians
Challenge Records (1994) artists
Black Saint/Soul Note artists
CAM Jazz artists